Live Trax is a live compilation album of songs from the Dave Matthews Band's Live Trax series.  The album was released on July 31, 2007, and is sold exclusively at Starbucks Coffee locations.  A total of nine tracks are featured on the compilation—one from each of the nine Live Trax volumes released between November 2004 and June 2007.

Promotion
The album was promoted by both Starbucks and XM Satellite Radio, along with the promotion of XM's new station, Starbucks XM Café.  During the first month of the album's release, Starbucks featured in-store sweepstakes for customers who signed up for an XM Radio trial, where they would be entered to win various prizes, including Dave Matthews Band concert tickets, and passes for a meet-and-greet session with Dave Matthews, himself.  In addition to the sweepstakes, XM featured special episodes of the Starbucks XM Café radio show The Daily Grind, featuring highlights from the album during the entire week following the album's release.

Track listing
"Dancing Nancies"
from Live Trax Vol. 7
"When the World Ends"
from Live Trax Vol. 8
"Where Are You Going"
from Live Trax Vol. 2
"You Might Die Trying"
from Live Trax Vol. 9
"#41"
from Live Trax Vol. 4
"Don't Drink the Water"
from Live Trax Vol. 6
"Grace Is Gone"
from Live Trax Vol. 3
"Pantala Naga Pampa" » "Rapunzel"
from Live Trax Vol. 1
"Tripping Billies"
from Live Trax Vol. 5

References

Dave Matthews Band live albums
2007 live albums
2007 compilation albums